The 1892 United States presidential election in Connecticut took place on November 8, 1892, as part of the 1892 United States presidential election. Voters chose six representatives, or electors to the Electoral College, who voted for president and vice president.

Connecticut voted for the Democratic nominee, former President Grover Cleveland, who was running for a second, non-consecutive term over incumbent President Republican Benjamin Harrison. Cleveland won the state by a narrow margin of 3.26%.

Results

See also
 United States presidential elections in Connecticut

References

Connecticut
1892
1892 Connecticut elections